Ten ships of the Royal Navy have borne the name HMS Renard, or HMS Reynard, after the French for fox, and the anthropomorphic figure of Reynard:
 was an 18-gun sloop that  captured from the French in July 1781. She became a hospital ship in Antigua in 1781–82, and was broken up in 1784.
 was an 18-gun sloop, previously a French privateer. The British captured her in 1797 and sold her in 1809.
 was a French naval 12-gun schooner that  captured in 1803; The Admiralty later renamed her HMS Crafty. The Spanish captured Crafty in 1807.
 was a 10-gun  launched in 1808 and sold for breaking up in 1818.
 was a 10-gun Cherokee-class brig-sloop launched in 1821. She was renamed HMS Renard in 1828, reclassified as a mooring vessel in 1841, and was broken up in 1857.
 was a unique wooden screw sloop launched in 1848 and wrecked in 1851.
 was a  launched in 1856 and broken up in 1866.
 was a Beagle-class schooner launched in Sydney in 1873 and sold in 1883.
 was an  launched in 1892 and sold in 1905.
 was a  launched in 1909 and sold in 1920.

Footnotes
Notes

Citations

References

Demerliac, Alain (1996) La Marine De Louis XVI: Nomenclature Des Navires Français De 1774 À 1792. (Nice: Éditions OMEGA). 

Royal Navy ship names